Piao Shihao (born 9 July 1991 in Wangqing County, Yanbian) is a Chinese footballer of Korean descent who currently plays as a defensive midfielder or defender for Shijiazhuang Ever Bright.

Club career
Piao Shihao started his professional football career in 2011 when he was promoted to Yanbian FC's first squad. He would gradually establish himself as a vital member of the team and go on to win the division title and promotion to the top tier when the club won the 2015 China League One campaign. On 5 March 2016, Piao made his Super League debut in the first match of 2016 season against Shanghai Shenhua, coming on as a substitute for Chi Zhongguo in the 82nd minute.

On 27 February 2019, Piao transferred to fellow League One side Shijiazhuang Ever Bright. He would make his debut on 10 March 2019 in a league game against Nantong Zhiyun that ended in a 2-1 victory. In his first season with the club he would help the team to a runners-up position and promotion into the top tier.

Career statistics
Statistics accurate as of match played 31 December 2020.

Honours

Club
Yanbian FC
 China League One: 2015

References

External links
 

1991 births
Living people
Chinese footballers
People from Wangqing County
Yanbian Funde F.C. players
Cangzhou Mighty Lions F.C. players
Chinese Super League players
China League One players
Chinese people of Korean descent
Association football defenders
Association football midfielders